Reverend George Wilson McPhail D.D. (December 26, 1815 – June 28, 1871) was a Presbyterian minister, and educator who served as the sixth president of Lafayette College, a director at Princeton Theological Seminary, and as the fifth president of Davidson College.

Biography
McPhail was born in Norfolk, Virginia in 1815 and attended Hampden–Sydney College for a period of two years before entering Yale University where he graduated in 1835. After college, McPhail returned to Virginia where he attended Union Presbyterian Seminary, studying theology.

After his ordainment, McPhail was called upon to preach at a number of churches, leaving at various times due to health problems. He started in Prince George County, Virginia before moving to Buckingham, Virginia, Fredericksburg, Virginia, and finally the Brainard church in Easton, Pennsylvania. While at the Brainard church, in 1857, he was elected as president of nearby Lafayette College where he served until 1863. While at Lafayette, McPhail worked with Francis March, who was previously appointed as an instructor to the school under the tutelage of former president Daniel V. McLean, on recommendation from McPhail. March, a revolutionary academic, was the first individual to teach English in a college setting, and McPhail was instrumental in creating courses specific to the philological study of the English language - something every other American college afterwards began to do.

During the 1861 school year, and with the advent of the American Civil War, Lafayette saw a drastic decrease in enrollment. Though interest in the school began again after the Battle of Antietam, when Lee invaded Pennsylvania the rush to arms by students statewide was so great it left Lafayette almost without pupils. Commencement in 1863 therefore did not take place as there were not enough students capable of  graduating. Seniors who joined the military efforts ended up graduating the following year, and due to the financial pressures of a college without students, McPhail resigned in 1863.

After Lafayette, McPhail taught at an all-ladies seminary in Philadelphia before taking on the role as president at Davidson College in 1867. While at Davidson, McPhail took gratification in leading many students into the church of Christ, many of whom would later join the ministry themselves. During his time at Davidson, McPhail's condition slowly worsened, yet he was able to continue fulfilling his obligations until a short time before his death. Ultimately, he became ill while signing diplomas for the class of 1871 and died before the commencement of that year.

Personal life
McPhail married Mary C. Page in December 1840. Together they had four children, though three died while McPhail was still alive, causing him much grief.

In 1857, McPhail was awarded with an honorary degree of Doctor of Divinity from Jefferson College.

McPhail died on June 28, 1871, in Davidson, North Carolina at the age of 55.

References

External links
 Biography from the Davidson College Archives & Special Collections

1815 births
1871 deaths
Presidents of Davidson College
Presidents of Lafayette College
Yale University alumni
Union Presbyterian Seminary alumni
People from Norfolk, Virginia
People from Buckingham, Virginia
Lafayette College trustees
People from Davidson, North Carolina